Qabil transliterates two different Arabic names: قابيل (the name of Cain) and قابل. It may refer to:

People
Habil and Qabil, or Cain and Abel
Maulawi Qabil, detainee in Bagram
Mohammed Qabel (born 1988), Iraqi footballer
Qabil Ajmeri (1931–1962), Indian-Pakistani Urdu poet

Places
Qaryat al-Qabil, a village in Yemen
Al Qabil, a village in Oman

See also
Ghabel (disambiguation), a related name
Kabil (disambiguation), a related name
 Qabiil, the Somali word for clan